Central Abaco is one of the districts of the Bahamas, in the Abaco Islands. The district contains the largest town in the Abacos, Marsh Harbour, which is the commerce centre for the islands. Some of the more noticeable settlements are:

 Little Harbour
 Lake City
 Spring City
 Marsh Harbour
 Dundas Town

The Local Government for this district is based in Marsh Harbour which is also one of the three Town Areas (the others being Murphy Town Township and Dundas Town Township).

References

Districts of the Bahamas
Abaco Islands